"My Last Night with You" was a UK top 30 chart hit record for the band Arrows in 1975 produced by Mickie Most.

A soulful ballad, the song was written by Roger Ferris and Glo Macari,  and sung by Arrows lead vocalist Alan Merrill.

The brass arrangement was done by John Cameron and played by the CCS horn section.

References

1975 singles
Arrows (British band) songs
Song recordings produced by Mickie Most
Songs written by Roger Ferris
1975 songs
RAK Records singles